Annette Bening is an American actress who has received various awards and nominations, including two Golden Globe Awards, one BAFTA Award and two Screen Actors Guild Awards. Additionally, she has been nominated for four Academy Awards and eight Golden Globe Awards.

Achievements and Honors
 2006: Bening was awarded the Ibsen Centennial Commemoration Award
 2006: Bening was honored with a star on the Hollywood Walk of Fame
 2014: Bening was recognized by Elle during the Women in Hollywood Awards, honoring women for their outstanding achievements in film, spanning all aspects of the motion picture industry, including acting, directing, and producing 
2019: Bening received the Movies For Grownups Career Achievement Award from the AARP Foundation

Main Awards

Academy Awards
The Academy Awards are a set of awards given by the Academy of Motion Picture Arts and Sciences

Primetime Emmy Awards

Tony Awards

Film and Television Awards

Golden Globe Awards
The Golden Globe Award is an accolade bestowed by the 93 members of the Hollywood Foreign Press Association (HFPA) recognizing excellence in film and television, both domestic and foreign.

Screen Actors Guild Awards
The Screen Actors Guild Awards are organized by the Screen Actors Guild‐American Federation of Television and Radio Artists. First awarded in 1995, the awards aim to recognize excellent achievements in film and television.

British Academy Film Awards
The British Academy Film Award is an annual award show presented by the British Academy of Film and Television Arts.

Critics' Choice Movie Awards
The Critics' Choice Movie Awards are presented annually since 1995 by the Broadcast Film Critics Association

Independent Spirit Awards
The Independent Spirit Awards are presented annually by Film Independent, to award best in the independent film community.

Gotham Awards
Presented by the Independent Filmmaker Project, the Gotham Awards award the best in independent film.

Other Awards

American Comedy Awards

Blockbuster Entertainment Awards

Dorian Awards

Golden Raspberry Awards

Hollywood Film Festival
The Hollywood Film Awards are held annually to recognize talent in the film industry.

Irish Film & Television Awards
The Irish Film & Television Academy Awards are presented annually to award best in films and television.

MTV Movie Awards & TV Awards
The MTV Movie Awards is an annual award show presented by MTV to honor outstanding achievements in films. Founded in 1992, the winners of the awards are decided online by the audience.

Satellite Awards
The Satellite Awards are a set of annual awards given by the International Press Academy.

Gregory Peck Award 
The Gregory Peck Award for Cinematic Excellence is awarded in memory of actor Gregory Peck to honor an actor, producer or director's life's work. In 2016, it was presented to fellow San Diego native Bening at the San Diego International Film Festival.

Critics associations

References

Bening, Annette